Madrid High School is a public high school located in Madrid, Iowa, part of the Madrid Community School District.

The mascot of Madrid High School (MHS) is the Tiger, and the school colors are orange and black. The school fight song is set to the tune of the Notre Dame Victory March,

Athletics
Until 2007, the Tigers competed in the Heart of Iowa Conference. Madrid currently competes in the West Central Conference.

Madrid has a rich history in football over the past quarter century, making an appearance in the state playoffs 26 out of the past 27 years. Those appearances include 7 semi-final appearances, 8 state championship game appearances and 1 state championship in 1991. Coach Randy Hinkel lead the Tiger program from 1987 until his sudden death in 2015 and compiled a 266–60 record as coach of the Tigers. Hinkel is one of 12 coaches in Iowa high school history with over 300 career wins.

Madrid also has a rich history in track as they have won 5 state titles, all since 1998. Three of those state titles came consecutively in 2009, 2010 and 2011. Madrid has also produced numerous individual state track champions as well.

Academic/Other Activities
Notable clubs at Madrid High School include National Honor Society (NHS), Family, Career and Community Leaders of America (FCCLA), Spanish Club and Book Club.

Madrid has also garnered a reputation over the years of a very good performing arts school, excelling at choir, band and speech.

References

External links
review at Publicschoolreview.com

Public high schools in Iowa
Schools in Boone County, Iowa
1883 establishments in Iowa